Ethylene tetrafluoroethylene (ETFE) is a fluorine-based plastic. It was designed to have high corrosion resistance and strength over a wide temperature range. ETFE is a polymer and its source-based name is poly(ethene-co-tetrafluoroethene). It is also known under the brand name Tefzel. ETFE has a relatively high melting temperature and excellent chemical, electrical and high-energy radiation resistance properties.  When burned, ETFE releases hydrofluoric acid.

Properties
Useful comparison tables of PTFE against FEP, PFA and ETFE can be found on DuPont's website, listing the mechanical, thermal, chemical, electrical, and vapour properties of each, side by side.

ETFE is effectively the high-strength version of the other three in this group, often featuring slightly diminished capacities in other fields by comparison.

Combustion of ETFE occurs in the same way as a number of other fluoropolymers, in terms of releasing hydrofluoric acid (HF).  HF is extremely corrosive and toxic, and so appropriate caution must be exercised.

ETFE film is self-cleaning (due to its nonstick surface) and recyclable. It is prone to punctures by sharp edges and therefore mostly used for roofs. As a film for roofing it can be stretched and still be taut if some variation in size, such as that caused by thermal expansion, were to occur. Employing heat welding, tears can be repaired with a patch or multiple sheets assembled into larger panels.

ETFE resins are resistant to ultraviolet light. An artificial weathering test (comparable to 30 years’ exposure) produced almost no signs of film deterioration.

ETFE systems can control light transmission through the use of frit patterns printed on the foil. Thermal and acoustic insulation can be incorporated into an ETFE structure via the use of multi-layer systems which use low-pressure air pumps to create ETFE "cushions".

Applications

ETFE was developed by DuPont in the 1970s initially as a lightweight heat resistant film in the aerospace industry. From its development it was largely used infrequently in agricultural and architectural projects. ETFE's first large-scale use architecturally came in 2001 at the Eden Project where ETFE was selected as it can be printed and layered to control solar conditions and because it was found to have a low friction coefficient, which saves on maintenance as dust and dirt do not stick.

An example of its use is as pneumatic panels to cover the outside of the football stadium Allianz Arena or the Beijing National Aquatics Centre (a.k.a. the Water Cube of the 2008 Olympics) – the world's largest structure made of ETFE film (laminate). The panels of the Eden Project are also made from ETFE, and the Tropical Islands have a 20,000 m2 window made from this translucent material.

Another key use of ETFE is for the covering of electrical and fiber-optic wiring used in high-stress, low-fume-toxicity and high-reliability situations.  Aircraft, spacecraft and motorsport wiring are primary examples. Some small cross-section wires like the wire used for the wire-wrap technique are coated with ETFE.

As a dual laminate, ETFE can be bonded with FRP as a thermoplastic liner and used in pipes, tanks, and vessels for additional corrosion protection.

ETFE is commonly used in the nuclear industry for tie or cable wraps and in the aviation and aerospace industries for wire coatings. This is because ETFE has better mechanical toughness than PTFE. In addition, ETFE exhibits a high-energy radiation resistance and can withstand moderately high temperatures for a long period. 
Commercially deployed brand names of ETFE include Tefzel by DuPont, Fluon by Asahi Glass Company, Neoflon ETFE by Daikin, and Texlon by Vector Foiltec.

Due to its high temperature resistance ETFE is also used in film mode as a mold-release film. ETFE film offered by Guarniflon or Airtech International and Honeywell is used in aerospace applications such as carbon fiber pre-preg curing as a release film for molds or hot high-pressure plates.

Notable buildings

Notable buildings and designs using ETFE as a significant architectural element:
 Allianz Arena, Munich, Germany
 Beijing National Aquatics Centre, (the Water Cube) Beijing, China
 Eden Project, Cornwall, United Kingdom
 Khan Shatyr Entertainment Center, Nur-Sultan, Kazakhstan

 National Space Centre, Leicester, United Kingdom
 Cuauhtémoc Stadium, Puebla, México.
 Midland Metropolitan University Hospital, Smethwick, Birmingham, United Kingdom
 U.S. Bank Stadium, Minneapolis, Minnesota, United States
 SoFi Stadium. Inglewood, California, USA
 Allegiant Stadium, Las Vegas, Nevada, USA.
 Hard Rock Stadium, Miami Gardens, Florida, United States
 Banc of California Stadium. Los Angeles, California, United States
 Avenues Phase-III, Al-Rai, Kuwait
 Dworzec Tramwajowy Centrum, tram station in Łódź, Poland.
 Solaris, Clamart, France
 Discovery College, Lantau Island, Hong Kong
 Green 18, Hong Kong Science Park, Hong Kong
 Pavilion, Alnwick Castle, Alnwick, United Kingdom
 BC Place, Vancouver, British Columbia, Canada,

 River Culture Pavillon The ARC, Daegu, South Korea
 Munich's municipal waste management department, Munich, Germany (2011)
 Beijing National Stadium, Beijing, China
 FestiveWalk, Resorts World at Sentosa, Singapore
 Dolce Vita Tejo Shopping Centre, Amadora, Lisbon, Portugal
 roof, dedicated underground rail station at the Heathrow Airport Terminal 5, London, United Kingdom
 Manchester Victoria station concourse, Manchester, United Kingdom
 Forsyth Barr Stadium at University Plaza, Dunedin, New Zealand
 Islazul Shopping Centre, Madrid, Spain
 Kansas City Power & Light District, Kansas City, Missouri, United States
 South Campus skylight structures, Art Center College of Design, Pasadena, California, United States
 Tanaka Business School, London, United Kingdom
 The Shed (Hudson Yards). Manhattan, New York, USA
 Tropical Islands, Brandenburg, Germany
 Barnsley Interchange, Barnsley, United Kingdom
 The Mall Athens, Athens, Greece
 Newport railway station, Newport, United Kingdom
 The Elements, Livingston, United Kingdom
 Experimental Media and Performing Arts Center, Rensselaer Polytechnic Institute, Troy, New York, United States
 Arena Pernambuco, Recife, Brazil
 Sandton City, Sandton, South Africa
 Key West Shopping Centre, Krugersdorp, South Africa
 Oceanus Casino, Macau, Special Administrative Region of China.
 Masdar city, Abu Dhabi, United Arab Emirates
 ISS Building Lancaster University
 Empire City Casino, Yonkers, New York, United States
 Institute of Technical Education, Singapore (2012)
 The SSE Hydro, Glasgow, Scotland
 Anaheim Regional Transportation Intermodal Center, California (12-13-14)
 National Stadium, Singapore
 Orto Botanico di Padova Biodiversity Garden roof, Padua, Italy
 Guangzhou South Railway Station, China
 Yujiapu Railway Station, China
 Persian Garden, Iran Mall, Tehran, Iran
 Anoeta Stadium, San Sebastian, Spain
 Ed Kaplan Family Institute for Innovation and Tech Entrepreneurship, Illinois Institute of Technology, Chicago, Illinois
 Mercedes-Benz Stadium, Atlanta, Georgia (2017)
 US Embassy ETFE Facade, London, UK (2017)
 Tron Lightcycle Power Run, Shanghai Disneyland, China (2017) 
 UQ Global Change Institute Living Building, Brisbane, Australia (2013)
 Lakhta Center, St. Petersburg, Russia (2019)

 Haneda Airport Terminal 2, International Flight Facilities, Tokyo, Japan (2020)
 Macquarie University Arts Precinct ETFE Roof, Sydney, Australia (2020)
 Rhodes Central Commercial Development, Sydney, Australia (2021)

Under construction
Avenues Phase IV & IVB, Al-Rai, Kuwait
Jungle Exhibit, Sedgwick County Zoo, Wichita, Kansas (2015), United States
West End Stadium, Cincinnati, Ohio, USA
Dockside Pavilion, Sydney, Australia (2014)
Baku Olympic Stadium, Baku, Azerbaijan (2015)
Australian Embassy, Jakarta, Indonesia (2014)
Wharf Retail, Bluewaters Island, Dubai (2016)
Carlisle Railway Station, Carlisle, Cumbria (2017)
Oxigeno, San Francisco, Heredia Province, Costa Rica
Jakarta International Stadium, Jakarta, Indonesia
Primark Birmingham, UK
Boston Logan Airport (terminal E), Boston, Massachusetts (2021-2022) 
 Tron Lightcycle Power Run, Walt Disney World, US (2022)

References

External links
 ETFE Resins - Chemours Teflon

Building materials
Copolymers
Fluoropolymers
Plastics
Thermoplastics